Namibia's telephone numbering plan was originally devised when the country, then known as South West Africa, was under South African administration, and integrated into the South African telephone numbering plan.

Area codes beginning with 06 were  allocated to Namibia, including Walvis Bay, a South African exclave, which was not transferred to Namibian sovereignty until 1994.

Following Namibia's independence in 1990, direct dialing between Namibia and South Africa was discontinued, and calls were classed as international. Consequently, subscribers were required to use the international access code and country calling code, omitting the trunk code 0. Namibia had already been allocated its own country code by the International Telecommunication Union, +264, in the late 1960s.

Windhoek, Namibia to Johannesburg, South Africa
Before 1992: 011 xxx xxxx
After 1992: 00 27 11 xxx xxxx

Johannesburg, South Africa to Windhoek, Namibia
Before 1992: 061 xxx xxx
After 1992: 09 264 61 xxx xxx
 After Jan 2007: 00 26461 xxx xxx

List of area codes in Namibia
061  - Windhoek
062  - Okahandja 
062  - Hosea Kutako International Airport
062  - Rehoboth 
062  - Uis 
063  - Keetmanshoop
063  - Lüderitz
063  - Oranjemund
063  - Karasburg
064  - Swakopmund
064  - Walvis Bay
067  - Otjiwarongo
067  - Outjo
066  - Rundu
063  - Mariental
067  - Tsumeb
067  - Kombat 
067  - Grootfontein 
065  - Oshakati
065  - Ondangwa
062  - Gobabis
062  - Witvlei 
060  - Telecom Switch cellular mobile (GSM; seven-digit subscriber numbers)
081   - MTC cellular mobile (GSM; seven-digit subscriber numbers)
083   - Paratus Telecommunications IP Voice (IP; seven-digit subscriber numbers)
084   - MTN Namibia
085   - tnmobile cellular mobile (GSM; seven-digit subscriber numbers)

The international access code is now 00 but was previously 09.

References

External links
Telecom Namibia
Communications Regulatory Authority of Namibia
International Telecommunication Union - National Numbering Plan
World Telephone Numbering Guide

External links
ITU allocations list

Namibia
Telephone numbers